Magic Kid (also known as Little Ninja Dragon; released in the Philippines as Ninja Sidekick) is a 1993 American film.

Plot
Kevin Ryan is an 11-year-old karate-champion from Kalamazoo, Michigan, who spends his summer with his uncle, Bob Ryan and his girlfriend Anita in California. His older sister Megan is coming with him. Bob owns a management bureau for clowns-acts. He has money problems and owes $10,000 to a mafioso named Tony. Because of all his problems he starts and ends his day with a bottle of Jack Daniels, even in his morning-coffee. Tony wants his money back and sends his nephew and two collectors to Bob. Bob is still in bed when the Mafia arrive, but Kevin sees the three thugs entering the house to take $15,000 off Uncle Bob. Tony is very pissed about it, so Bob takes his niece and nephew out of the house. Kevin offers to help his uncle against the bad guys. Megan gets in trouble when she goes to a club to meet her hero Tommy Hart. The bad guys recognize her and want to kidnap her, but Bob and Kevin, who were looking for Megan, arrive just in time. Kevin takes out the thugs, but then comes 'The Animal', a big, very large tough guy. And then comes Don 'the Dragon' Wilson to save the day.

Cast
Stephen Furst as Bob Ryan
Ted Jan Roberts as Kevin Ryan
Shonda Whipple as Megan
Joseph Campanella as Tony
Sandra Kerns as Anita
Don "The Dragon" Wilson as himself

Release
Magic Kid was released direct-to-video in the United States in 1993. In the Philippines, the film was released in theaters as Ninja Sidekick by Viking Films on February 1, 1994.

Sequel
In 1994 a sequel was made, called Magic Kid 2.

References

External links

1993 films
1993 martial arts films
American martial arts films
1990s American films
Films directed by Joseph Merhi